The 2nd ASEAN Grand Prix Women's Volleyball Invitation was the second edition of the ASEAN Grand Prix. It is an international women's volleyball tournament contested by 4 national teams that are the members of the Southeast Asian Zonal Volleyball Association (SEAZVA), the sport's regional governing body affiliated to Asian Volleyball Confederation (AVC). Games were played at Nakhon Ratchasima, Thailand from 9 to 11 September 2022.

Teams

Venue
The list of the host city and venue are the following:

Pool standing procedure
 Total number of victories (matches won, matched lost)
 In the event of a tie, the following first tiebreaker was to apply: The teams was to be ranked by the most point gained per match as follows:
Match won 3–0 or 3–1: 3 points for the winner, 0 points for the loser
Match won 3–2: 2 points for the winner, 1 point for the loser
Match forfeited: 3 points for the winner, 0 points (0–25, 0–25, 0–25) for the loser

Squads

League results
 All times are Indochina Time (UTC+07:00).

|}

|}

Final standings

Awards

Most Valuable Player

Best Setter

Best Outside Spikers

Best Middle Blockers

Best Opposite Spiker

Best Libero

Prize Money
The winners will receive US$25,000, while second placed team will receive US$20,000. Third place holder will be rewarded with US$15,000, fourth placed one is US$10,000.

References

2022 in Thai sport
International volleyball competitions hosted by Thailand
ASEAN
2022 in women's volleyball